is a song by Japanese singer-songwriter Rina Aiuchi. It was released on 11 February 2009 through Giza Studio, as the third single from her seventh studio album Thanx. The single reached number seventeen in Japan and has sold over 5,506 copies nationwide. The song served as the theme songs to the Japanese morning television shows, The Sunday Next and Joho Paradise.

Track listing

Charts

Certification and sales

|-
! scope="row"| Japan (RIAJ)
| 
| 5,506
|-
|}

Release history

References

2009 singles
2009 songs
J-pop songs
Song recordings produced by Daiko Nagato
Songs written by Rina Aiuchi